Essig is a German surname meaning "vinegar". Notable people with the surname include:

 Christian Essig (born 1986), German footballer
 David Essig (born 1945), Canadian singer-songwriter
 Edward Oliver Essig (1884–1964), American entomologist
 George Emerick Essig (1838–1923), American painter and etcher

See also 
 Essig, Minnesota, unincorporated community in Brown County, Minnesota, United States
 Essig (Swisttal), a village in North Rhine-Westphalia, Germany

German-language surnames